Mar do Sertão is a Brazilian telenovela produced and broadcast by TV Globo, that aired from 22 August 2022 to 17 March 2023. The telenovela is created by Mário Teixeira. It stars Isadora Cruz, Sergio Guizé and Renato Góes.

Cast 
 Isadora Cruz as Candoca
 Sergio Guizé as Zé Paulino
 Renato Góes as Tertulinho
 Cyria Coentro as Dodôca
 Débora Bloch as Deodora
 José de Abreu as Coronel Tertúlio
 Enrique Diaz as Timbó
 Giovana Cordeiro as Xaviera
 Caio Blat as Pajeú
 Clarissa Pinheiro as Teresa
 Lucas Galvino as Mirinho
 Sara Vidal as Rosinha
 Manu Guimarães as child Rosinha
 Thardelly Lima as Vespertino
 Suzy Lopes as Cira 
 Nanego Lira as Padre Zezeo
 Everaldo Pontes as Adamastor 
 Welder Rodrigues as Sabá Bodó
 Érico Brás as Eudoro Cidão
 Leandro Daniel as Floro Borromeu
 Eli Ferreira as Laura Pinho 
 Felipe Velozo as Tomás
 Déo Garcez as Catão
 Ana Miranda as Ismênia
 Mariana Sena as Lorena
 Theresa Fonseca as Labibe
 Pedro Lamin
 Wilson Rabelo
 Titina Medeiros as Nivalda
 César Ferrario as Zahym
 Quitéria Kelly as Latifa
 José Dumont
 Bruno Dubeux as Savinho 
 Cosme dos Santos as Janjão
 Matteus Cardoso as Zé Leiteiro
 Renan Monteiro
 Julia Mendes as Anita
 Giovanna Figueiredo as Jessilaine
 Enzo Diniz as Manduca
 Miguel Venerabile as Joca
 Theo Matos as child Cirino

Production

Development 
In June 2021, it was announced that Mário Teixeira presented to TV Globo the first episodes of the telenovela, in which they were approved and ordered to enter the 6pm time slot. In August 2021, it was announced that the telenovela would be directed by Vinícius Coimbra, who had previously worked with Teixeira in Liberdade, Liberdade, and that the story would be set in the Sertão region. In October 2021, Mar do Sertão was announced as the official title of the telenovela. In February 2022, Vinícius Coimbra was removed from the production after accusations of racism reported behind the scenes of Nos Tempos do Imperador, and was replaced by Allan Fiterman.

Ratings

References

External links 
 

2022 telenovelas
2022 Brazilian television series debuts
2023 Brazilian television series endings
2020s Brazilian television series
TV Globo telenovelas
Brazilian telenovelas
Portuguese-language telenovelas
Television series about revenge